The 1978 Mutual Benefit Life Open, also known as the South Orange Open, was a men's tennis tournament played on outdoor clay courts at the Orange Lawn Tennis Club in South Orange, New Jersey in the United States. The event was part of the 1978 Grand Prix circuit. It was the ninth edition of the tournament and was held from July 31 through August 6, 1978. First-seeded Guillermo Vilas won his second consecutive singles title at the event and earned $15,000 first-prize money.

Finals

Singles
 Guillermo Vilas defeated  José Luis Clerc 6–1, 6–3
 It was Vilas' 4th singles title of the year and the 39th of his career.

Doubles
 John McEnroe /  Peter Fleming defeated  Ion Țiriac /  Guillermo Vilas 6–3, 6–3

References

External links
 ITF tournament edition details

South Orange Open
South Orange Open
South Orange Open
South Orange Open
South Orange Open
Tennis tournaments in New Jersey
South Orange Open